415th may refer to:

415th Bombardment Group, inactive United States Air Force unit
415th Flight Test Flight (415 FLTF), squadron of the United States Air Force Reserves
415th Tactical Fighter Squadron, inactive United States Air Force unit

See also
415 (number)
415, the year 415 (CDXV) of the Julian calendar
415 BC